The 4th Line Theatre is a Canadian theatre company located near the small town of Millbrook, Ontario in the township of Cavan Monaghan that is dedicated to producing and developing original Canadian theatre, from small-town stories to broad national sagas – written by and about Canadians.

History
Founded by Robert Winslow in 1992, after his mother's passing left him with the 150-acre farm property that has been in his family for 150 years, Rob launched theatre with the classic The Cavan Blazers.  Based on the story of the 19th-century Orangemen in Millbrook who violently tried to drive out Catholics who attempted to settle in the area. 
Winslow has directed and written many of the plays.  Some of the more recent productions have been directed by Kim Blackwell.

For the theatre's 25th season in 2016, an art show celebrating past productions was held in Millbrook. One of the 2016 productions featured was The Hero of Hunter Street, a play about a tragic industrial accident in the history of Peterborough, Ontario.

Recent productions

2011
The Cavan Blazers. (second production)
The Berlin Blues by Drew Hayden Taylor

2012
Queen Marie by Shirley Barrie
St Francis of Millbrook by Sky Gilbert

2013
The Winslows of Derryvore by Robert Winslow  (second production)
The Real McCoy, by Andrew Moodie

2014
Wounded Soldiers by Ian McLachlan and Robert Winslow 
Doctor Barnardo's Children by Ian McLachlan and Robert Winslow

2015
The Bad Luck Bank Robbers by Alex Poch-Goldin (inspired by the 2006 book Bad Luck Bank Robbers about the Havelock Bank Robbery)
Gimme That Prime Time Religion

2016
The Hero of Hunter Street by Maja Ardal
The Bad Luck Bank Robbers (second production) by Alex Poch-Goldin

2017

. Bombers: Reaping the Whirlwind

by David S. Craig; Directed by David Ferry 

. The History of Drinking in Cavan

written and directed by Robert Winslow

2018
Crow Hill The Telephone Play Ian McLachlan and Robert Winslow
Who Killed Snow White? by Judith Thompson

References

External links
 4th Line Theatre

Theatre companies in Ontario
Peterborough County